{{Drugbox
| IUPAC_name = ethyl 4-[(2S)-3-[3-[(E)-''N-hydroxycarbamimidoyl]phenyl]-2-[[2,4,6-tri(propan-2-yl)phenyl]sulfonylamino]propanoyl]piperazine-1-carboxylate
| image = Upamostat_structure.png

| tradename =
| legal_US = 
| legal_status = Investigational new drug

| bioavailability =  
| metabolism =  
| elimination_half-life =  
| excretion =

| CAS_number = 1191101-18-4
| PubChem = 9852201
| UNII = S5M7KW6U17
| ChemSpiderID = 28189283
| DrugBank = DB13052

| CAS_number_Ref = 
| UNII_Ref = 

| C=32 | H=47 | N=5 | O=6 | S=1 
| molecular_weight = 629.8
| SMILES = CCOC(=O)N1CCN(CC1)C(=O)[C@H](CC2=CC(=CC=C2)/C(=N\O)/N)NS(=O)(=O)C3=C(C=C(C=C3C(C)C)C(C)C)C(C)C
| StdInChI=1S/C32H47N5O6S/c1-8-43-32(39)37-14-12-36(13-15-37)31(38)28(17-23-10-9-11-24(16-23)30(33)34-40)35-44(41,42)29-26(21(4)5)18-25(20(2)3)19-27(29)22(6)7/h9-11,16,18-22,28,35,40H,8,12-15,17H2,1-7H3,(H2,33,34)/t28-/m0/s1
| StdInChIKey = HUASEDVYRABWCV-NDEPHWFRSA-N
}}Upamostat (WX-671, Mesupron''') is a drug which acts as an inhibitor of the serine protease enzyme urokinase. It is under development as a potential treatment agent for pancreatic cancer, acting to inhibit tumour metastasis.

References 

Experimental drugs
Serine protease inhibitors